The Ogoki River is a river in the Thunder Bay and Cochrane Districts of Ontario. It springs from the wilderness just east of Savant Lake, flowing north of Lake Nipigon to Ogoki, where it joins the Albany River which empties into James Bay.

The Ogoki River is a  narrow, deep, slow-moving, and anastomosing river, with high sediment content. Rapids occur where the river crosses bedrock shelves. The Speckled Trout Rapids, a particularly large set of rapids, is located between Harrogate and Patience Lake. An extensive delta and estuary system has developed where the river enters Ogoki Lake.

The river, now mostly used for canoeing and fishing, was part of a canoe route from Hudson Bay to Lake Superior: via James Bay, Albany River, Ogoki River, portage to Ombabika River, Lake Nipigon, Nipigon River, and finally Lake Superior.

Portions of the river are protected in the Wabakimi Provincial Park and Ogoki River Provincial Park.

Fauna
The following fish species have been identified in Ogoki River system:

 walleye
 northern pike
 lake sturgeon
 yellow perch
 lake whitefish
 white sucker
 spottail shiner
 Iowa darter
 Johnny darter
 logperch
 redhorse sucker
 longnose dace
 sculpin
 ninespine stickleback
 burbot
 lake chub
 mimic shiner
 trout-perch
 fathead minnow
 speckled (brook) trout

Diversion
In 1943, the Hydro-Electric Power Commission of Ontario diverted a large part of the upper Ogoki to flow into Lake Nipigon and on to the Great Lakes. This diversion was intended to increase water flow for the Sir Adam Beck Hydroelectric Generating Stations at Niagara Falls, downstream of Lake Erie.

Although the water levels have improved in the Great Lakes, it has also caused a major drop in water levels and unnatural flooding in the Ogoki River.

Ogoki River Provincial Park

It also includes Ogoki Lake in its entirety, as well as Kayedon, Harrogate, and Patience Lakes. It was established in 2004 and serves as an important recreational waterway, offering remote tourism and recreation opportunities such as angling, hunting, wildlife viewing, and backcountry canoe camping.

Significant features of the park include a diversity of upland and wetland vegetation, as well as a number of glacial features. It also has a number of plant species that are of regional significance, such as the sandbar willow, along the riverbanks, and the ovate spikerush, found on an Ogoki Lake beach.

It is a non-operating park, meaning that there are no facilities or services. Permitted activities include boating, canoeing, fishing, and hunting.

See also
List of Ontario rivers

References

Rivers of Thunder Bay District
Rivers of Cochrane District
Tributaries of Hudson Bay